The 2007 season is Santiago Wanderers 81st season in the Primera División, the 44th in the Campeonato Nacional and the 8th consecutive season since their last promotion in 1999. This article shows player statistics and all matches, official and friendly, that the club played during the 2007 season.

In a season made to commemorate its 115th anniversary, the club had a poor performance during the year, by finishing the Torneo Apertura in 20th position with 13 points and the Torneo Clausura in 5th place of the Group A with 17 points. As a consequence, Santiago Wanderers was relegated to Primera B for the 2008 season, after finishing the year table in 20th position with 30 points.

This season marked the sixth time in history that Wanderers was relegated to Primera B, after their previous relegations in 1977, 1980, 1984, 1991 and 1998.

Squad

Transfers

Apertura 2007
In
  Richard Benítez (from  Deportes Antofagasta)
  Juan Robledo (from  Santiago Morning)
  Mauricio Tampe (from  Cobresal)
  Víctor Hugo Ávalos (from  Curicó Unido)
  Luis Benítez (on loan from  Racing Club)
Out
  Luis Oyarzún (to  O'Higgins)
  José Contreras (to  Huachipato)
  Alejandro Carrasco (to  Deportes Melipilla)
  Roberto Luco (on loan to  Trasandino)

Clausura 2007
In
  Pablo Fontanello (from  Tigre)
  José Miguel Farías (from  Ñublense)
  Patricio Monsalves (from  Universidad de Concepción)
  Víctor Cancino (from  Coquimbo Unido)
  Javier Robles (on loan from  Vélez Sarsfield)
  Daniel Fernández (from  Coquimbo Unido)
  Sergio Zúñiga (free agent)
Out
  Víctor Hugo Ávalos (to  Fernández Vial)
  Felipe Valderrama (to  Everton)
  Luis Benítez (to  Racing Club)
  Michael Silva (to  Club León)

Post-season (2008)
Out
  Juan Robledo (to  Mjällby AIF)
  José Soto (to  Deportes Concepción)

Competitions

Friendlies
Mid-season

Torneo Apertura

Standings

Results summary

Matches
The schedule for the Apertura tournament was unveiled on 26 January 2007. Wanderers debuted against Universidad Católica.

Torneo Clausura

Standings
Overall table

Group 1

Relegation table

References

External links
RSSSF

2007
Chilean football clubs 2007 season
Santiago